Azhagarsamiyin Kuthirai is a 2011 Tamil-language mystery comedy drama film directed by Suseenthiran, based on the short story of the same name penned by writer Bhaskar Sakthi. The film stars Appukutty and Saranya Mohan in lead and features music by Ilaiyaraaja. The film was initially reported to be jointly produced by Gautham Vasudev Menon's Photon Kathaas and Escape Artists Motion Pictures. but was then produced by the latter only, while Cloud Nine Movies would distribute film. The film released on 12 May 2011 to critical acclaim but commercially did average collections.

The film was screened at the 2011 Toronto International Film Festival, becoming the second Tamil film to be screened there after Kannathil Muthamittal (2002). In 2012, the film was honored with two National Film Awards for Best Popular Film Providing Wholesome Entertainment and Best Supporting Actor for Appukutty.

Plot
The story is set in a village called Mallayapuram near Theni. The villagers believe the Rain Gods will favour them after the annual Temple Festival (Thiruvizha), during which the deity is taken around the village on a wooden horse. They are in for a rude shock when the horse goes missing. At the same time, Azhagarsami, a youngster who earns his livelihood by ferrying loads on his horse in Aagamalai village in Periyakulam, gets ready for his marriage. His horse also goes missing, and his marriage is put on hold. Whether the villagers and Azhagarsami find their respective horses or not forms the rest of the story.

Cast
 Horse as Agamalai Appu
 Appukutty as Azhagarsami
 Saranya Mohan as Rani
 Inigo Prabakaran as Ramakrishnan
 Advaitha as Devi
 Soori as Chandran
 Aruldoss as Rajaram
 Yogi Devaraj as Rani's father
 Azhagan Tamizhmani 
 Krishnamoorthy as Priest
 Supergood Subramani as Priest

Production
The film was made in 90 days on a budget of ₹5.85 crore (worth ₹14 crore in 2021 prices).

Release

Critical reception
The film opened to very positive reviews. Rediff's Pavithra Srinivasan labelled the film as "brilliant" and "a must-watch for its unconventional story-line, protagonists and plot-points", giving it 3.5/5. Sify's critic described the film as "good" that deserved a "viewing because films like this are hard and few to find in these days of mass masala",further citing that Suseenthiran had "come out with another beautiful feel good film that pulls at your heart strings." A reviewer from Behindwoods gave the film 3/5, terming the film as "a charming and happy rural tale which is fairly engaging". The critic praised the film as a "simple heartwarming and realistic film" and one of those film "where content is the king" as well as the director "for having his heart at the right place and making the movie entirely realistic".

The Hindu critic Malathi Rangarajan, too, gave a positive feedback, describing the film as an "innovative" and "interesting attempt" that stayed "within the format of commercial cinema even while steering clear of formula!" Anupama Subramanian from Deccan Chronicle termed the film as a "simple, heartwarming and refreshing deviation from the mainstream mayhem [that] definitely warrants a watch", while giving it three out of five too. Rohit Ramachandran of nowrunning.com gave it 3/5 stars stating that "Azhagarsamiyin Kudhirai is an original satirical comedy that's well executed,thanks to a talented writer-director duo that's to be kept an eye on. You will walk out smiling."

International screenings
The film is the only South Indian candidate to be selected for screening at the 2011 Toronto International Film Festival in the contemporary world cinema category.

Awards
National Film Awards
 Best Popular Film Providing Wholesome Entertainment
 Best Supporting Actor - Appukutty

Soundtrack

Following collaborations with V. Selvaganesh and Yuvan Shankar Raja, Suseenthiran worked with Ilaiyaraaja for the musical score of Azhagarsamiyin Kuthirai. The soundtrack album, consisting of only three songs, was released at a grand event on 16 March 2011 at Sathyam Cinemas, with several prominent celebrities participating, while Ilaiyaraaja himself launched the audio.

References

External links
 

Indian mystery comedy-drama films
2010s mystery comedy-drama films
Films based on short fiction
Films featuring a Best Supporting Actor National Film Award-winning performance
Films directed by Suseenthiran
2011 films
Films scored by Ilaiyaraaja
2010s Tamil-language films
Best Popular Film Providing Wholesome Entertainment National Film Award winners
2011 comedy films
2011 drama films